The following is a list of CART Championship Car drivers who practiced and intended to qualify for one or more sanctioned races but failed to qualify for a race.

 Mark Alderson1
 Steve Barclay
 Neil Bonnett
 Buddie Boys
 John Brooks
 Bob Brutto
 Steve Butler
 Earle Canavan
 Dana Carter1
 Frank Chianelli
 Rick DeLorto
 Ed Finley1
 Woody Fisher
 Giupponi Franca
 Todd Gibson1
 Davey Hamilton2
 Milt Harper
 Bill Henderson1
 Bruce Hill
 Steve Hostetler
 Richard Hubbard1
 Jim Hurtubise1
 Ray Lipper
 Mack McClellan
 Larry McCoy1
 Kenji Momota
 Brad Murphey2
 Bobby Olivero1
 Jan Opperman1
 Wally Pankratz
 Dave Peperak
 Bill Puterbaugh1
 José Romano
 Barry Ruble
 Harry Sauce
 Ken Schrader1
 Orio Trice
 Tod Tuttle
 Robby Unser2
 Leroy Van Conett
 Dean Vetrock1
 Jeff Ward2
 Kevin Whitesides

1Successfully qualified for one or more USAC Champ Car race.

2Later qualified for Indy Racing League IndyCar Series races

See also
List of IndyCar Series drivers who never qualified for a race
List of American Championship Car Rookie of the Year Winners

References

CART World
ChampCarStats.com

Champ Car
Drivers